Rankovce is a village in North Macedonia. It is a seat of the Rankovce municipality which covers an area of Slavishko field that belongs to the famous region of Kriva Reka.

Demographics
As of the 2021 census, Rankovce had 1,337 residents with the following ethnic composition:
Macedonians 1,113
Roma 137
Persons for whom data are taken from administrative sources 78
Others 9

According to the 2002 census, the village had a total of 1,192 inhabitants. Ethnic groups in the village include:
Macedonians 1,133
Serbs 1
Romani 53
Others 5

References

Villages in Rankovce Municipality